In education in Ireland, a voluntary secondary school (or privately-owned secondary school) is a post-primary school that is privately owned and managed. Most are denominational schools, and the managers are often Catholic Church authorities, especially in the case of Catholic schools. Like national schools at primary level, voluntary secondary schools are supported by the Department of Education, on a per capita basis. Approximately 90% of teachers' salaries are met by the state. Some schools charge tuition fees, while many others request top-up funding or voluntary  fee contributions from parents. The local community may also be involved in fund raising.

Until 1966, all post-primary schools were voluntary secondary schools except for vocational schools run by Vocational Education Committees. The raising of the school leaving age by Donogh O'Malley triggered the creation of publicly managed community and comprehensive schools. Some smaller secondary schools subsequently merged with each other or with the public schools. Voluntary secondary schools  still form the largest part of the post-primary school system and are attended by about 60% of post-primary education students.

The schools are generally managed by a Board of Management or less often a patron or religious institute. A school principal is in general control of everyday business. Some voluntary secondary schools are boarding schools, this is particularly so in the case of Protestant, many of which are Church of Ireland, as students cannot commute daily to such schools which are often located only in a few provincial towns. These schools generally receive additional grants to the normal per capita grant.

Footnotes

References
 

 
School types
Secondary education in Ireland